Weston is a town in the Hunter Region of New South Wales, Australia. At the 2016 census it recorded a population of 3,693.

Weston's post office opened on 25 January 1904.

Notes

References

Suburbs of City of Cessnock
Towns in the Hunter Region